Ruby Macie Muhammad (née Grier) ( – died March 2, 2011) was an African American religious figure and centenarian  known as the "Mother of the Nation of Islam." She was born on a farm in Sandersville, Georgia and grew up in Americus. No birth certificate exists to confirm her age, and it has been reported with significant disparity, although she claimed in newspaper interviews that she was born Ruby Macie Grayer on March 20, 1897. Later research, however, suggests she was born in 1907, a decade later, based on the listing of Ruby Macie Grier, recorded as aged 3, in the 1910 census.

Her mother,  died when she was very young, and she was raised by a woman she called her aunt, although she would later say that this woman was probably not her biological aunt. She did not know her father until she was a teenager. Community records in Sandersville, where she was born, indicate her father died at age 107 and her great-grandfather died at age 110.

Mother of Islam 
Muhammad spent her early years working in the fields and joined the Nation of Islam in 1946 and was named "Mother of the Nation of Islam" in 1986 by Minister Louis Farrakhan. This is an honorary title; Muhammad, who was married twice, was not the widow of Elijah Muhammad, who founded the Nation of Islam. 

In 2006, Muhammad moved into a senior center in Rancho Cordova, Sacramento, California. In 2008, Muhammad, then known as Ruby Pittman (the name of her first husband), received a motorized wheelchair as a donation from a scooter store.

Personal life
Ruby Muhammad was married to John Pittman and had four children. After her first husband died she married James Hyder in 1967.

References

External links
Sacramento News & Review interview with Ruby Muhammad, July 13, 2006
Ruby Muhammad's website, owned by her daughter Paulette Helton

1900s births
2011 deaths
20th-century African-American women
20th-century African-American people
21st-century African-American women
African-American centenarians
African-American people
Age controversies
American centenarians
Members of the Nation of Islam
People from Americus, Georgia
People from Sacramento, California
People from Sandersville, Georgia
Women centenarians